Ramnagar is a constituency of the Uttar Pradesh Legislative Assembly covering the city of Ramnagar in the Barabanki district of Uttar Pradesh, India. It is one of five assembly constituencies in the Barabanki Lok Sabha constituency. Since 2008, this assembly constituency is numbered 267 amongst 403 constituencies.

Bharatiya Janta Party candidate Sharad Kumar Awasthi is the MLA who won in 2017 Uttar Pradesh Legislative Assembly election defeating Samajwadi Party candidate Arvind Kumar Singh by a margin of 22,727 votes.

Election results

2022

See also
Ram Nagar, Barabanki
Chief Electoral Officer, Uttar Pradesh>Information and Statistics>AC's,PC's Booths>Assembly Constituencies>267-Ram Nagar

References

External links
 

Assembly constituencies of Uttar Pradesh
Barabanki district